The 2025 Women's Rugby League World Cup will be the seventh staging of the Women's Rugby League World Cup, to be held in France during October and  November 2025. The competition will run in parallel with the men's, wheelchair and under-19s tournaments.

The tournament will be competed for by 16 teams, double the number competing in the 2021 tournament.

Host selection
The International Rugby League (IRL) originally decided in 2016 to have the tournaments hosted in North America, but the IRL withdrew the hosting rights due to the promoters, Moore Sports International, being unable to guarantee the staging of the tournaments.

After re-opening the bidding to host the tournaments, the IRL awarded the hosting rights to France.

Qualification

The 2025 tournament will be the first time the Women's World Cup has held a qualifying competition. Regional allocations have been made; six European countries will be represented with another six from the Asia-Pacific countries; three places will be given to countries in North and South America and the final place will go to a country from the Middle East-Africa region.  As the eight teams competing in the 2021 tournament all pre-qualify for the 2025 competition and France are automatically included as the host nation, three of the European, two of the Americas places and four of the Asia-Pacific places are already known.

In mid-July 2022, the International Rugby League announced further details regarding qualification, including qualification tournaments and the expected participating teams in those tournaments.

Venues 
38 cities have bid to host matches of the four major tournament of the World Cup. These are:

Albi, Arras, Autun, Beauvais, Blagnac, Begles, Besancon, Biganos, Bordeaux, Boulazac, Carcassonne, Chambery, Chatillon, Issoire, Le Creusot, Le Mans, Libourne, Limoges, Limoux, Lourdes, Marmande-Tonneins, Martigues, Massy, Montauban, Montlucon; Narbonne, Nice, Paris, Periguex, Perpignan, Pia, Roanne, Salon-de-Provence, Toulouse, Trelissac, Vannes, Vichy, Villefrance-de-Rouergue, Villeneuve-sur-Lot.

Competitions
Seeing an increase from three in 2021, the 2025 World Cup alongside the primary have three other tournaments occurring simultaneously. Alongside the women's 2025 Rugby League World Cup sits the men's, wheelchair and youth world cups.

Notes

References

2025 Rugby League World Cup
Women's World Cup
Women's Rugby League World Cup
Women's Rugby League World Cup 2025
World Cup 2025